An Ciarraíoch Mallaithe is a traditional Irish song. A slow air romantic ballad, it means "The Cursed Kerryman".

References

Irish folk songs
Irish-language songs
Songwriter unknown
Year of song unknown